Nuestra Belleza El Salvador 2011 took place on June 30, 2011 at the Teatro Nacional de El Salvador in San Salvador.

Nuestra Belleza Universo 2010, Sonia Cruz; and Nuestra Belleza Mundo 2010, Gabriela Molina crowned their respective successors at the end of the event. 16 women participated in the event, which commemorated El Salvador's bicentenary. For the first time, 17-year-olds were allowed to participate, and a national costume showcase was also added to the event. The co-winners represented El Salvador at Miss Universe 2011 and Miss World 2011.

Results

Candidates

Crossovers
Contestants who previously competed at other beauty pageants:

Miss Earth 2009
 Mayra Aldana

External links
 

Beauty pageants in El Salvador
2011 beauty pageants